Col d'Ares or Coll d'Ares (el. 1513 m) is a mountain pass in the Pyrenees on the border between France and Spain.

It connects Prats-de-Mollo in France with Molló in Catalonia, Spain.

History 
In 1691, during the Nine Years' War, the Spanish passed through the Col d'Ares to try taking Prats-de-Mollo, without success.

This pass also used during the Retirada during the Spanish Civil War by fleeing Spaniards supporting the Republican cause.

See also
 List of highest paved roads in Europe
 List of mountain passes

References

Mountain passes of the Pyrenees
France–Spain border crossings
Mountain passes of Catalonia
Mountain passes of Occitania (administrative region)